Kafr Yasif (Kufr Yaseef) is an Arab town in the Northern District of Israel. The population of Kafr Yasif is half Christian (52.1%) with the rest Muslim (44.9%), and a small Druze community.

History
Many ancient remains have been excavated  at Kafr Yasif, including mosaic floors, Corinthian columns, and cisterns cut in rock.

Remains dating to the   Persian, Hellenistic (4th-3rd centuries BCE) and Roman periods have been found here. According to a tradition from Kafr Yasif, cited by F.M. Abel, the village was named Kefar Akko until Josephus fortified it and named it after himself.

Remains dating to the   Byzantine and Early Islamic (Umayyad/Abbasid) periods have been found here.  Furnaces used in the manufacture of  glass;  starting in the Byzantine (or possibly Roman) period  and continuing into the Umayyad/Abbasid  (fifth–seventh centuries CE) era have been found here.

During the Crusader era in Palestine it was known as Cafresi, Cafriasif, or Cafriasim. In 1193 Queen Isabella I and her spouse Henry of Champagne granted the casale of Kafr Yasif to prior Heinrich of the Teutonic Knights. In the 13th century it was inhabited by Christians and paid tithes to the Bishop of Acre. In 1257 Kafr Yasif appears in a document relating to a disagreement between the Bishop of Acre and the Teutonic Knights about its income.

At one point it was a casale of the Knights Hospitallers. It was part of the domain of the Crusaders during the hudna (truce) between the Crusaders based in Acre and the Mamluk sultan al-Mansur Qalawun in 1283. 

Remains dating to the Crusader and  Mamluk periods have been found here.

Ottoman Empire

During Ottoman rule, Kafr Yasif primarily grew olives and cotton. Ottoman tax records from 1596 showed that Kafr Yasif had a population of 58 Muslim households, seven Muslim bachelors and 19 Jewish households. The villagers paid a fixed tax-rate of 25% on various agricultural products, including wheat, barley, fruit trees, cotton, goats and beehives, winter pastures, jizya (poll tax), in addition to "occasional revenues"; a total of 12,877 akçe. All of the revenue went to a waqf. In 1618 the Druze chief Fakhr al-Din II destroyed the home of the local Shia Muslim notable Ahmad Quraytim in Kafr Yasif, then part of the Ma'nid-controlled Safad Sanjak, because Quraytim fled to Fakhr al-Din's rival, the governor of Lajjun, Ahmad Turabay.

In the 1740s ten Jewish households under the spiritual leadership of Rabbi Soloman Abadi settled in Kafr Yasif and were joined by a number of other Jews, leaving Safad in the early 1760s as a result of the Near East earthquakes of 1759. According to Jewish travelers, the Jews in Kafr Yasif lived well under the auspices of Arab Zahir al-Umar, the autonomous Ottoman ruler of the Galilee (1730–1775), whose tolerance had allowed for the initial establishment of the village's Jewish community. A map by Pierre Jacotin from Napoleon's invasion of 1799 showed the place, named as Koufour Youcef.

In 1838 Kafr Yasif was classified as having a Greek Orthodox Christian majority with Muslim and Druze minorites. In 1880 the village had a population of about 600, of which 500 were Greek Orthodox Christians and 100 were Muslims. A 17th-century church was located in the village and it contained a number of pictures provided by Russia. The village contained a stone-cut well, stone reservoirs and troughs. According to the Palestine Exploration Fund's Survey of Western Palestine, Kafr Yasif was a stone-built village surrounded by olive groves and arable land, and provided with water from cisterns. The population consisted of 300 Christians, who worshiped at the Greek Orthodox chapel, and 50 Druzes. A population list from about 1887 showed that Kafr Yasif had about 910 inhabitants; three quarters Greek Catholic Christians, one quarter Muslim.

British Mandate 

In the 1922 census of Palestine conducted by the British Mandate authorities Kafr Yasif had a population of 870 residents; 665 Christians, 172 Muslims and 33 Druze. On 1 December 1925 Kafr Yasif became one of the few Arab villages in the Galilee to receive local-council status during the British mandate period. Yani Kustandi Yani served as mayor from 1933 to 1948. The 1931 census of Palestine recorded Kafr Yasif's population as 1,057.

In April 1938, during the Arab revolt in Palestine, a group of Palestinian Arab rebels planted a mine on the road near Kafr Yasif which blew up a British vehicle, killing nine soldiers (according to the Arabs) or one soldier and wounding two others (according to the British). The British Army proceeded to start setting Kafr Yasif ablaze in retaliation, but were then informed by local residents that Kuwaykat's inhabitants were responsible for the attack. The British troops fatally shot nine Arabs as they approached the village. Between 14–17 February 1939, the British Army set between 68 and 72 homes ablaze in Kafr Yasif in response to another mine attack on British soldiers driving on a newly constructed security road which resulted in the death of one soldier and the wounding of two others. It was later discovered by the British authorities that the attackers were not from Kafr Yasif. In compensation, the town was rebuilt by the British with a school and a city hall which are still in use today. According to a British chaplain, "The people at Kafr Yasif were very eager to point out that the troops who destroyed their houses were not English but Irish."

In the 1945 statistics Kafr Yasif had a population of 1,400, and the village had 6,763 dunams of land according to an official land and population survey. 350 were Muslim, 1,105 Christians and 40 "other" (Druze). 3,234 dunams were plantations and irrigable land, 3,310 were used for cereals, while 75 dunams were built-up (urban) land.

Israel 

On 8–14 July 1948, during the 1948 Arab-Israeli War, the Carmeli Brigade and the 7th Armored Brigade occupied Kafr Yasif as part of the first stage of Operation Dekel. Unlike in many captured Arab towns, the majority of the population did not flee, and about 700 inhabitants of nearby villages, especially al-Birwa, al-Manshiyya and Kuwaykat, took refuge there. On 28 February 1949, most of them were put into trucks and driven to the front lines, where they were forced to cross the frontier border into Lebanon. On 1 March another 250 refugees were deported. Knesset member Tawfik Toubi strongly protested these expulsions.

Kafr Yasif is one of the few Arab towns in the Galilee that retained most of the land it held before 1948. Of 673 hectares owned in 1945, 458 hectares remained in 1962, with 76 hectares expropriated in 1952–1953.<ref>S. Jiryis, The land question in Israel, MERIP Reports, No. 47 (May, 1976) pp. 5–20, 24–26</ref> On 5 June 1951 the Israeli government reactivated the local council in the only example of an Arab local council that continuously existed after 1948. In the first elections, held in 1954, the former mayor Yani Yani was re-elected mayor as head of a Communist Party and Nationalist Group (Kafr Yassif List) coalition, defeating the Mapai candidate. Yani remained in office until his death in 1962. He became leader of the Arab Popular Front which evolved into the Al Ard movement. The APF campaigned for the protection of Waqf properties in Israel. In 1972–1973, Violet Khoury was elected mayor of Kafr Yasif, making her the first Arab woman to head a local council in Israel. The population remained under martial law until 1966.

The first meeting of the Congress of Druze Intellectuals took place in Kafr Yasif on 26 August 1966. The initiative behind the formation of the congress came from the youth of Druze villages in the Galilee, led by Salman Faraj. When the Druze leadership in the Department of Minority Affairs gained knowledge of the congress's planned meeting and failed to persuade Faraj to postpone it, the spiritual head of the Druze community, Sheikh Amin Tarif, locked the gates of the al-Khadr Shrine, where the meeting was to be held. The congress was instead held in a nearby house in the town and one of the clauses of the summit expressed Druze solidarity with the other Arab communities of Israel.

Kafr Yasif became the site of the first major violent incident between Christians and Druze in Israel on 11 April 1981. The clash began during a football match between fans of the town's local team and that of the nearby Druze village of Julis; a young man from Julis was fatally stabbed by a Christian from Kafr Yasif. Although reconciliation talks were immediately arranged to prevent further violence, the local council of Kafr Yasif refused to give up the name of the alleged killer. Hundreds of Druze youths from Julis subsequently entered Kafr Yasif, prompting the mayor to call for emergency back-up from the regional Israeli Police, a request which was denied. On 13 April about 60 armed police-officers positioned themselves in the field between the two villages, and while a sulha'' (traditional Arab peace agreement) was being negotiated, a group of heavily-armed Julis residents stormed the town, burning down 85 houses, 17 stores, a few workshops and 31 cars. A church was also damaged. By the end of the attack three residents of Kafr Yasif had been shot dead and more were wounded. The police did not intervene, with some officers claiming they were not sufficiently armed. None of the attackers, which according to witnesses included some off-duty Druze soldiers from the Israeli Army, were arrested. Most of the compensation for the damage came from the Muslim waqf of Israel and a smaller portion from the World Council of Churches.

Demographics

Kafr Yasif's population  was 1,730 in 1950, of which 300 were internally displaced Palestinians and were 60 Druze. In 1951, 27% of Kafr Yasif's 1,930 inhabitants were internally displaced. In the 1961 census there were 2,975 inhabitants (1,747 Christians, 1,138 Muslims and 90 Druzes). In 1995 the population was recorded as 6,700.

In the 2009 census Kafr Yasif had a population of 8,700, with Christians accounting for 56% of the inhabitants, Muslims 40% and Druze 4%.

The largest family in Kafr Yasif is the Safiah.

Landmarks
It is popular belief that the tomb of the monotheistic saint, al-Khadr is located in Kafr Yasif. The site is especially venerated by the Druze, some of whom make annual pilgrimages to the tomb on January 25. The structure is composed of a large convention hall adjacent to the tomb, along with rooms and courtyards that serve both pilgrims and other visitors. Al-Khadr is the Arabic name for Saint George in Christianity. There are four churches and two mosques in the town. The main bishop of the town's Orthodox Christian community is Atallah Makhouli.

Culture and education

According to the historian Atallah Mansour, Kafr Yasif is the "most academic Arab town in Israel", while journalist Sylvia Smith calls it "the preeminent [Arab] cultural town". With the near total depopulation of the Palestinian Arabs in the major cities of Haifa and Jaffa as a result of the 1948 war, Kafr Yasif became one of a few villages in the newly-established state of Israel to emerge as a central space for Arab culture and politics. Its schools, proximity and location between major cities and other Arab villages, the relatively equal distribution of land ownership among its households and the diversity brought about by the influx of internally displaced Palestinians all contributed to its local importance. In 1948 it was the only Arab locality in the Galilee to contain a high school outside of the cities of Nazareth, Shefa-Amr and Haifa. Following the war, the high school enrolled students from over fifty Arab villages. Several students, including Mahmoud Darwish, became well-known poets, and the village hosted weekly poetry recitals.

The Rabeah Murkus Dance Studio, Israel's first Arab dance studio, is located in Kafr Yasif. Rabeah Murkus, daughter of former Kafr Yasif mayor Nimr Murkus, also opened a dance study track for Arab high school students authorized by the Israeli Ministry of Education. The track serves 10th–12th graders in several Arab communities in northern Israel. A student of the dance studio, Ayman Safiah, born and raised in Kafr Yasif, became the first Palestinian male ballet dancer and, according to Israeli journalist Esti Ahronovitz, was "considered the first Arab classical-modern dancer". Several thousand mourners attended his funeral in Kafr Yasif on 28 May 2020.

Notable people

 Amal Murkus

See also
 Arab localities in Israel

References

Bibliography

External links

Welcome To Kafr Yasif
Survey of Western Palestine, Map 3: IAA, Wikimedia commons 

Archaeological sites in Israel
Arab localities in Israel
Arab Christian communities in Israel
Druze communities in Israel
Local councils in Northern District (Israel)
Historic Jewish communities